The Trzebiatowski Coast is a Polish mesoregion located on the Bay of Pomerania.

The coast is known for its abundance of beaches, which are popular seaside resorts and summer tourist destinations in Poland. Such include (east to west): Dźwirzyno, Mrzeżyno, Pogorzelica, Niechorze, Rewal, Trzęsacz, Pustkowo, Pobierowo, Dziwnówek.

Landforms of West Pomeranian Voivodeship